Diorama is the fourth studio album by Australian alternative rock band Silverchair, released on 31 March 2002 by Atlantic/Eleven. It won the 2002 ARIA Music Award for Best Group and Best Rock Album. The album was co-produced by Daniel Johns and David Bottrill. While Bottrill had worked on albums for a variety of other bands, Diorama marked the first production credit for lead singer Johns.

Johns wrote most of the album at the piano instead of his usual guitar, while the band took a 12-month break following their previous studio album, Neon Ballroom. Silverchair worked with composer Van Dyke Parks on Diorama; the album contains numerous orchestral arrangements and power ballads, a change from the grunge music typical of their earlier work, but consistent with the band's previous orchestrations on Neon Ballroom. The album's title refers to "a world within a world". Four singles were released: "The Greatest View", "Without You", "Luv Your Life", "Across the Night". All appeared on the Australian singles chart.

Diorama was successful in the charts but was not as well received by critics as the band's earlier albums. It reached number one on the Australian Recording Industry Association (ARIA) Albums Chart and received a rating of 71 (out of 100) on review aggregator Metacritic. It was certified triple-platinum by ARIA, selling in excess of 210,000 copies, and won five ARIA Awards in 2002. Diorama was nominated for Highest Selling Album in 2003, and three songs from the album were nominated for awards over the two years.

Recording and production
On Diorama, Silverchair worked with a new producer, David Bottrill, who replaced Nick Launay. Though Launay had produced the band's three previous albums, lead singer Daniel Johns decided he needed someone "who understood where he wanted to go". Johns believed Diorama would be "the kind of record that people were either going to be into or were really going to hate", and needed a producer who would understand the band's new direction. He interviewed several candidates, eventually choosing Bottrill and taking the role of co-producer himself.

Johns initially recorded eight songs, only to delete the files thinking they were too similar to tracks on the previous album, Neon Ballroom. Leaving the security and darkness of his earlier work, he restarted from scratch to create something more uplifting. Diorama represented a radical change in Silverchair's musical structure; the heavy grunge influence on their prior work was replaced by string and horn ensembles and highly complex song structures. Johns felt more comfortable in making this radical change rather than a minor one, finding it helped him to regain his passion for music, which had diminished during the grunge days. Johns wrote much of the album at a baby grand piano; he had previously taught himself the instrument and composed songs on it for the first time with Diorama. This change in songwriting technique had a significant effect on the sound of the album; Johns commented on the difference in how his vocals resonated with piano as compared to guitar. He worked with others in developing the album; Van Dyke Parks (Beach Boys, U2) collaborated on orchestral arrangements, and the pair spent much of their recording time attempting to describe the music in metaphorical terms, with Johns describing Parks' orchestral swells as "tidal waves" and violins as "a flock of birds". The pair described the collaborative experience as "mind-blowing". A DVD titled Across the Night: The Creation of Diorama was released in 2002, featuring interviews with Johns and Parks.

Several songs on Diorama were inspired by Johns' then-girlfriend Natalie Imbruglia, but he cautioned against possible misinterpretations of the songs, stating: "Everyone will think that any lyric that's about someone in a positive light will be about her" and noting that there were other people he cared for about whom he wrote the songs. Johns denied rumours that he had written songs intending Imbruglia to sing them.

Silverchair intended to tour supporting Diorama following its release, but plans were postponed when Johns developed reactive arthritis, causing his joints to swell and making guitar playing and singing too painful. After performing "The Greatest View" at the 2002 ARIA Awards, Johns said that he wanted "to perform [Dioramas] 11 songs at least once in front of an audience" before laying the album to rest. He travelled to California to receive treatments for his arthritis, including daily physiotherapy.

Album and single releases

Following a 31 March 2002 release on record label Eleven, Diorama reached number one on the ARIA Albums Chart on 14 April, making it Silverchair's fourth chart-topping album. It went on to be certified triple-platinum by ARIA, indicating sales in excess of 210,000 copies. The album peaked at number seven in New Zealand, thirteen in Austria, forty in Switzerland, and 116 in France. Diorama reached number ninety-one on the U.S. Billboard 200.

The first single, "The Greatest View", was released in advance of the album on 28 January 2002. It reached number three in Australia, where it was also certified gold, and number four in New Zealand and Canada. It charted at number thirty-six on Billboards Hot Modern Rock Tracks in 2007 when re-released alongside the band's next album, Young Modern. Johns wrote "The Greatest View" as a response to the media "always watching [him] in different ways". It was not intended to be aggressive but rather a straightforward commentary on the media frenzy that had surrounded the band for many years.

On 13 May 2002, "Without You" was released as the second single. It peaked at number eight in Australia but dropped to number twenty-nine the following week, spending only five weeks on the chart. The song was first announced by Silverchair bass guitarist Chris Joannou in November 1999, when he told fans the band had "a very small cache of recorded material stored away", including "Without You". "Without You" was followed by "Luv Your Life", which peaked at number twenty in Australia after its 20 September release. The inspiration for the song came to Johns during a therapy session, based on the idea that "there were people in the world who needed treatment but couldn't afford therapy." Johns composed most of the song's lyrics while listening to a therapist. In a performance at London's Shepherd's Bush Empire, Johns jokingly said "Luv Your Life" was dedicated "to all my ladies".

The final single "Across the Night" was released on 11 March 2003. The song, which Johns wrote over nine hours on a sleepless night, peaked at number twenty-four on its three weeks on the Australian chart. The arrangement by Parks features twin keyboards and a full orchestra. The band's much-delayed tour in support of Diorama took its name from "Across the Night".

The Diorama Box

On 1 December 2002, a limited-edition CD box set was released as The Diorama Box, consisting of the first three singles from the album as well as an exclusive single, "After All These Years".

Reception

Diorama received a score of 71 out of 100 on review aggregator Metacritic, based on nine reviews. Australian radio station Triple J listeners voted the album number one on their Top 10 Albums of 2002, while Triple J staff Rosie Beaton and Gaby Brown placed it third and fifth respectively.

Music magazine Rolling Stone gave Diorama four and a half stars in Australia and three out of five stars in the US. Reviewer Mark Kemp praised Silverchair's development, saying that the band had developed a strong, independent musical ability, in contrast to their heavily influenced debut album, Frogstomp. Kemp spoke highly of the "heavy orchestration, unpredictable melodic shifts and a whimsical pop sensibility", also noting Parks' arrangements gave the music "more breadth and depth". He argued that the album's strength was a product of Johns' confidence, resulting in high quality on "World Upon Your Shoulders", "Tuna in the Brine", and "After All These Years". However, "Without You" saw Silverchair slip into "old habits", according to Kemp, and contained an "MTV-approved hook".

Bradley Torreano, of review website AllMusic, gave Diorama four stars, labelling it an AMG Album Pick. He began by noting that Silverchair's improvement from the Frogstomp era was impressive, and that Diorama saw the band "finally growing into their own skin". Bottrill's production was praised, and the result likened to Big Country and U2, while Johns showcased "his rich voice and shockingly catchy tunes with a gusto missing from their earlier albums". Torreano's criticism was reserved for two songs on the album; he described the apparent Goo Goo Dolls influences on "Without You" as "an unwelcome twist", and felt that on "One Way Mule", the band reverted "back to their grunge sound".

James Jam, of music magazine NME, was critical of Diorama, calling it "over-produced Aussie rock". Jam compared Silverchair to Bryan Adams in their attempt to "venture boldly into exciting new musical landscapes". "Tuna in the Brine" was "grossly pretentious and overblown", while he saw the album as a whole as inoffensive, especially in comparison to the band's past post-grunge. According to Jam, the band were not trying to make a mature musical statement with the album but rather "impress their parents".

Nikki Tranter of pop music website PopMatters called the album mature, praising everything from the cover art to the "finely crafted pop melodies". Tranter praised Diorama for standing out in the "very similar" Australian music scene. The majority of songs on the album were rated highly; she thought "The Greatest View" was a stand-out with "orchestral twangs", and "After All These Years" had "sweeping horns, introspective lyrics and soft, haunting vocals".

Rob O'Connor of Yahoo!'s music website gave Diorama a positive review, agreeing that the band had matured greatly since their early high-school releases. The pop songs on the album, "Luv Your Life" and "Too Much of Not Enough", were said to "glide", and O'Connor praised Johns for "whisper[ing] his lyrics with grace and subtlety" where in the past he would "shout in angst", drawing comparisons to Elliott Smith. His main critique of the album was that it still contained some "obligatory 'grunge' efforts"; he felt eliminating those would allow the band to reach its full potential. In April 2007 the album was described on SBS-TV's Great Australian Albums.

Commercial performance
Diorama charted highest in Australia; it spent 50 weeks on the ARIA Albums Chart, including a week at number one. This popularity was not matched in other countries; it spent ten weeks or less on all other charts, although it reached number seven in New Zealand.

Track listing

Notes
 A limited edition of the album comes with a short film titled "The Making of Diorama".
 The Australian limited edition has a cardboard cover, and a gift promo card included inside.
 The vinyl version of the album was issued only as a promo, and is limited to 500 copies worldwide.
 There is a limited edition cassette of the album.

Personnel
Daniel Johns – vocals, guitars, piano (tracks 2, 9, 11), harpsichord (track 1), orchestral arrangements (tracks 2, 4, 5, 9, 10)
Ben Gillies – drums, percussion
Chris Joannou – bass guitar

Additional personnel
David Bottrill – production
Anton Hagop – engineer
Bob Ludwig - mastering
Van Dyke Parks – orchestral arrangements (tracks 1, 6, 8)
Larry Muhoberac – orchestral arrangements (tracks 2, 4, 10, 11)
Rob Woolf – Hammond organ (tracks 3, 9, 10)
Michel Rose – pedal steel (track 7)
Paul Mac – piano (tracks 1, 4, 6, 7, 8, 10)
Jim Moginie – keyboards (tracks 2, 5), piano (track 5)

Charts

Weekly charts

Year-end charts

Certifications

See also

Silverchair discography

References

2002 albums
Albums produced by David Bottrill
Albums recorded in a home studio
ARIA Award-winning albums
Atlantic Records albums
Eleven: A Music Company albums
Silverchair albums